Peter Wolodarski (born 15 April 1978) is a Swedish journalist and television host. He has been the editor of the Stockholm-based Dagens Nyheter since 10 March 2013.

Early life
Wolodarski was born in Stockholm. His father, architect and town-planner Aleksander Wolodarski, emigrated to Sweden from Poland in the late 1960s.

Career
Wolodarski started his journalistic career at the age of twelve, working as one of the cub reporters (a knattereporter) on the Swedish television programme Barnjournalen (Children's Journal). He studied business administration at the Stockholm School of Economics and in 1999, at age of twenty-one,  started as an editorial writer on Expressen and as a TV host with Åke Ortmark on TV8.

Wolodarski has been writing editorials for Dagens Nyheter since 2001. He was appointed political editor 15 March 2009 and in January 2013 it was suggested he become editor-in-chief and formally took up the appointment of editor and legally accountable publisher (Swedish: ansvarig utgivare) on 10 March 2013. He has also hosted Studio 8 and Wolodarski on TV8 and has been on the editorial committee of Judisk Krönika (Sweden's Jewish Chronicle). He was granted a Nieman Fellowship at Harvard University (2008–09) where his studies included Russia's modern history.

Other activities
 European Council on Foreign Relations (ECFR), Member

Personal life
Wolodarski is married to the journalist Karin Grundberg Wolodarski.

References

External links

Peter Wolodarski on Resumé

1978 births
Living people
Journalists from Stockholm
21st-century Swedish journalists
Swedish Jews
Swedish people of Polish-Jewish descent
Dagens Nyheter journalists
Stockholm School of Economics alumni
Sommar (radio program) hosts
Dagens Nyheter editors